The president of the Republic of China, now often referred to as the president of Taiwan, is the head of state of the Republic of China (ROC), as well as the commander-in-chief of the Republic of China Armed Forces. The position once had authority of ruling over Mainland China, but its remaining jurisdictions has been limited to Taiwan, Penghu, Kinmen, Matsu and other smaller islands since the conclusion of Second Chinese Civil War.

Originally elected by the National Assembly, the presidency was intended to be a ceremonial office with no real executive power as the ROC was originally envisioned as a parliamentary republic. Since the 1996 presidential election, the president is directly elected by plurality voting to a four-year term, with incumbents limited to serving two terms. The incumbent, Tsai Ing-wen, succeeded Ma Ying-jeou on May 20, 2016, to become the first female president in the history of Taiwan.

Qualifications
 The Presidential and Vice Presidential Election and Recall Act states that a candidate for president or vice president must be a citizen of the Republic of China, at least 40 years old, and a resident of Taiwan Area for a period of no less than 15 years with a physical presence of no less than 6 consecutive months. 
 The following persons shall not be registered as candidates for the president:
 Military personnel
 Election officials
 People who hold foreign nationality or who hold residency of the People's Republic of China
 People who have restored their nationality or acquired their nationality by naturalization

Powers

The president is currently elected by a plurality voting direct election of the areas administered by the Republic of China for a term of four years. Before 1991, the president was selected by the National Assembly of the Republic of China for a term of six years.

The Constitution of the Republic of China names the president as head of state and commander-in-chief of the Republic of China Armed Forces (formerly known as the National Revolutionary Army). The president is responsible for conducting foreign relations, such as concluding treaties, declaring war, and making peace. The president must promulgate all laws and has no right to veto, but can approve or not the veto proposed by the Executive Yuan (Cabinet). Other powers of the president include granting amnesty, pardon or clemency, declaring martial law, and conferring honors and decorations.

The president may, by resolution of the Executive Yuan Council, issue emergency decrees and take all necessary measures to avert imminent danger affecting the security of the state or of the people or to cope with any serious financial or economic crisis. However, such decrees shall, within ten days of issuance, be presented to the Legislative Yuan for ratification. Should the Legislative Yuan withhold ratification, the said emergency decrees shall forthwith cease to be valid.

The president may, within ten days following passage by the Legislative Yuan of a no-confidence vote against the premier, declare the dissolution of the Legislative Yuan after consulting with its president. However, the president shall not dissolve the Legislative Yuan while martial law or an emergency decree is in effect. Following the dissolution of the Legislative Yuan, an election for legislators shall be held within 60 days.

The president can appoint senior advisors, national policy advisors and strategy advisors, but they do not form a council.

The Constitution does not clearly define whether the president is more powerful than the premier, as it names the Executive Yuan (headed by the premier) as the "highest administrative authority" with oversight over domestic matters while giving the president powers as commander-in-chief of the military and authority over foreign affairs. Prior to his election as president in 1948, Chiang Kai-shek had insisted that he be premier under the new Constitution, while allowing the president (to which Chiang nominated Hu Shih) be a mere figurehead. However, the National Assembly overwhelmingly supported Chiang as president and once in this position, Chiang continued to exercise vast prerogatives as leader and the premiership served to execute policy, not make it. Thus, until the 1980s power in the Republic of China was personalized rather than institutionalized which meant that the power of the president depended largely on who occupied the office. For example, during the tenure of Yen Chia-kan, the office was largely ceremonial with real power in the hands of Premier Chiang Ching-Kuo, and power switched back to the presidency when Chiang became president. After President Lee Teng-hui succeeded Chiang as president in 1988, the power struggle within the KMT extended to the constitutional debate over the relationship between the president and the premier. The first three premiers under Lee, Yu Kuo-hwa, Lee Huan, and Hau Pei-tsun were mainlanders who had initially opposed Lee's ascension to power. The appointment of Lee and Hau were compromises by President Lee to placate conservatives in the KMT. The subsequent appointment of the first native Taiwanese premier Lien Chan was taken as a sign of Lee's consolidation of power. Moreover, during this time, the power of the premier to approve the president's appointments and the power of the Legislative Yuan to confirm the president's choice of premier was removed establishing the president as the more powerful position of the two.

After the 2000 election of Chen Shui-bian as president, the presidency and the Legislative Yuan were controlled by different parties which brought forth a number of latent constitutional issues such as the role of the legislature in appointing and dismissing a premier, the right of the president to call a special session of the legislature, and who has the power to call a referendum. Most of these issues have been resolved through inter-party negotiations.

Succession

The Constitution of the Republic of China gives a short list of persons who will succeed to the presidency if the office were to fall vacant. According to the Additional Articles of the Constitution, Article 2:

As no president of the Executive Yuan (also known as the premier) has ever succeeded to the presidency under these provisions (or their predecessors, under Article 49), it is untested whether, should the office of the premier be vacant as well, whether, pursuant to the Additional Articles, Article 3, the vice president of the Executive Yuan (vice premier), who would be acting premier, would act as president. There is currently no constitutional provision for a succession list beyond the possibility that the vice president of the Executive Yuan might succeed to the presidency.

Assuming that the vice president of the Executive Yuan would be third in line for the presidency, the current line of succession is:
 Lai Ching-te, Vice President of the Republic of China.
 Chen Chien-jen, President of the Executive Yuan.
 Cheng Wen-tsan, Vice President of the Executive Yuan.

Presidential succession has occurred three times under the 1947 Constitution:
President Chiang Kai-shek declared incapacity on 21 January 1949 amid several Communist victories in the Chinese Civil War and was replaced by Vice President Li Tsung-jen as the acting president. However, Chiang continued to wield authority as the director-general of the Kuomintang and commander-in-chief of the Republic of China Armed Forces. Li Tsung-jen lost the ensuing power struggle and fled to the United States in November 1949. Chiang evacuated with the government to Taiwan on 10 December 1949 and resumed his duties as the president on 1 March 1950.
President Chiang Kai-shek died on 5 April 1975 and was replaced by Vice President Yen Chia-kan, who served out the remainder of the term.
President Chiang Ching-kuo died on 13 January 1988 and was replaced by Vice President Lee Teng-hui, who served out the remainder of the term and won two more terms on his own right.

Diplomatic protocol

The diplomatic protocol regarding the President of the ROC is rather complex because of the political status of Taiwan. In the nations that have diplomatic relations with the ROC, she is accorded the standard treatment that is given to a head of state. In other nations, she is formally a private citizen, although even in these cases, travel usually meets with strong objections from the People's Republic of China.

The president of ROC has traveled several times to the United States, formally in transit to and from Central America, where a number of countries do recognize the ROC. This system allows the president to visit the United States without the US State Department having to issue a visa. During these trips, the president is not formally treated as a head of state, does not meet US government officials in their official capacities and does not visit Washington, D.C. However, in these visits, the ROC president invariably meets with staff members from the US government, although these visits are with lower-ranking officials in non-governmental surroundings.

In the area of Southeast Asia, the ROC president was able to arrange visits in the early 1990s which were formally private tourist visits, however these have become increasingly infrequent as a result of PRC pressure.

At the annual Asia-Pacific Economic Cooperation leaders' summit, the ROC president is forbidden from attending personally and must send a special envoy to represent him or her at the event.

However, on 2 December 2016, US President-elect Donald Trump accepted a congratulatory telephone call from the ROC president, a clear break from prior protocol.

The Government of the People's Republic of China uses the terms Leader of the Taiwan Area, Leader of the Taiwan Region and Leader of the Taiwanese Authorities to describe the head of state of the Republic of China (ROC) in Taiwan. These terms are used by PRC media to reflect the PRC's official stance of not recognizing the legitimacy of the ROC.

The PRC media does not use the terms "President of Taiwan" nor "President of the Republic of China", which could be inferred as implying recognition of Taiwan as a country, or of Two Chinas. Hence, the term "Leader of the Taiwan Area" is used- with "Area" to show that Taiwan is not a country; while "Leader" does not equal "President". According to criteria set by the authorities in Beijing, media in mainland China generally are not allowed to use terms related to the Republic of China to describe the Taiwan authorities. But if the official title cannot be avoided in a news article, quotation marks would be used around terms for all official ROC positions and organizations, e.g. "President of the Republic of China"; "Presidential Office Building" to imply non-recognition. For other countries without official diplomatic ties, terms such as Taiwan's president have been used.

Secretary-general to the president

The secretary-general to the president is the highest-ranking official in the Office of the President and supervises the staff of the office. The current secretary-general is David Lee.

Elections

History 
Taiwan was previously led by the Emperor of Japan during colonial rule by Japan from 1895 to 1945, represented by the Governor-General of Taiwan. 

After the outbreak of the Wuchang Uprising against Qing rule in 1911, the revolutionaries elected Sun Yat-sen as the "provisional president" of the transitional government, with the Republic of China officially established on 1 January 1912. But Sun soon resigned from the provisional presidency in favor of Yuan Shikai, who assumed the title "Great President" in March 1912. Yuan induced the Last Emperor to abdicate, ending thousands of years of imperial rule in China. The 1913 Constitution called for a strong presidential system with notable checks on the president by the National Assembly. However, Yuan soon began to assert dictatorial power, ignoring the National Assembly and later abolishing it altogether. In 1915, Yuan proclaimed himself Emperor of China in a largely unpopular move and was forced to retract his declaration shortly before his death in 1916.

With Yuan Shikai's death the Warlord Era began. Vice President Li Yuanhong succeeded Yuan as president and attempted to reassert the constitutional government, but was soon forced to resign by military strongmen. The presidency, though leading an internationally recognized government, was thereafter to be headed by a series of prominent warlords. This presidency ended in 1928 when the Northern Expedition, led by the Kuomintang (KMT), succeeded in conquering North China.

Sun Yat-sen established a rival (military, not constitutional) government in Guangzhou in 1917 and took the title of "Generalissimo of the Military Government". He was ousted in 1918 but returned again to Guangzhou in 1921. Claiming to restore the Provisional Constitution of the Republic of China, he summoned the members of the original parliament to elect him as president, but since there lacked a quorum, he took the title of "Extraordinary President". Sun, again expelled from Guangzhou in 1922, returned in 1923 to take the title of "Generalissimo of the Military Government." Sun died in 1925 with no clear successor and leadership of the government, now named the National Government, rested in a series of Leninist-style dual party and state committees, the most powerful of which was the policy-making Central Executive Committee of the Kuomintang. The government was organized into five branches, with the Executive Yuan, headed by the premier, holding primary administrative authority. The "Chairman of the National Government," though not given specific presidential powers, took on the functions of a de facto head of state and its official English translation was "President of the National Government of the Republic of China". This form of government under the KMT lasted through the Northern Expedition, which moved the capital to Nanjing and gave the National Government domestic control and foreign recognition, and the Second Sino-Japanese War, during which the Japanese established a puppet "Reorganized" National Government with almost the identical organizational structure, until the promulgation of a new Constitution in 1947.

Following the Chinese victory in the Second Sino-Japanese War, the National Government under Chiang Kai-shek was restored in Nanjing and the KMT set out to enact a liberal democratic constitution in line with the last stage of Sun Yat-sen's three stages of national development. The new Constitution of the Republic of China, promulgated on 25 December 1947, established a five-branch government with the office of president as head of state. On 20 May 1948, Chiang Kai-shek was formally elected by the National Assembly to be the first term president.

After the KMT lost Mainland China in the Chinese Civil War, the government was evacuated to Taiwan, where the term limits for the president specified in the 1947 constitution were suspended after 1960. In 1954, as the term of the first National Assembly were about to expire, the Judicial Yuan ruled that the expired seats of the National Assembly would continue in power until the respective delegate region elections could be held. This largely froze the membership of the National Assembly mainland delegates and prevented local Taiwanese from widespread legislative and assembly participation in the expired mainland seats until the early 1970s. The members of the National Assembly continued in their office until 1991, and continued to elect Chiang Kai-shek as president until his death in 1975.

Presidents were elected by the National Assembly until the first direct presidential election in 1996, while the term length was shortened from six to four years.

Timeline of presidents 

 Cen Chunxuan was the president of the southern military government of the Republic of China from 1913 to 1921.

 1st Provisional President and Presidents after the 1947 Constitution

See also 
 Elections in Taiwan
 History of Taiwan
 Vice President of the Republic of China
 Premier of the Republic of China
 List of presidents of the Republic of China
 Politics of the Republic of China
 List of political parties in the Republic of China
 List of rulers of Taiwan
 Republic of China Presidential Museum

Notes

References

External links 

 Office of the President of the Republic of China
 Presidents and their Premiers

 

Articles which contain graphical timelines
China history-related lists
Chinese government officials
Government of the Republic of China
China